Stealing a Roast Duck is a silent short directed by Liang Shao-Bo in 1909; it is considered the first film from Hong Kong. The film stars Lai Pak-hoi in a lead role, while Shao-Bo stars as the eponymous duck thief. Due to the Japanese destroying film to make bombs with nitrate, no copy of the film is extant; there has been doubt whether the film even actually existed. There are also signs that the film was shown in 1917 in Los Angeles, which would make it the earliest Chinese film with a foreign release.

Cast 
 Lai Pak-hoi
 Liang Shao-Bo - duck thief
 Wong Chun-man

References

1909 films
1909 short films
1900s crime films
Hong Kong black-and-white films
Chinese silent short films
1909 lost films
Chinese crime films
Lost Chinese films
Films shot in Hong Kong
Hong Kong crime films